Sacrococcygeal ligament can refer to:
 Anterior sacrococcygeal ligament (ligamentum sacrococcygeum anterius)
 Lateral sacrococcygeal ligament (ligamentum sacrococcygeum laterale)
 Posterior sacrococcygeal ligament (ligamentum sacrococcygeum posterius)
 Deep posterior of the sacrococcygeal ligament (ligamentum sacrococcygeum posterius profundum)
 Superior part of the posterior sacrococcygeal ligament (ligamentum sacrococcygeum posterius superficiale)